Friedrich-Voldemar Hist (7 November 1900 Kaika, Vana-Antsla Parish (now Antsla Parish), Kreis Werro – 4 November 1943 Solikamsk, Russian SFSR) was an Estonian politician and painter. He was a member of IV Riigikogu.

References

1900 births
1943 deaths
People from Antsla Parish
People from Kreis Werro
Estonian Workers' Party politicians
Members of the Riigikogu, 1929–1932
20th-century Estonian painters
20th-century Estonian male artists
Estonian people who died in Soviet detention
People who died in the Gulag